Major-General Marshall St John Oswald  was a British Army officer who served as Director of Military Intelligence.

Military career
Oswald was commissioned into the Royal Artillery. He served in the Second World War during which he was awarded the Military Cross and the Distinguished Service Order.

After the War he became Chief of Staff for I (BR) Corps in 1959 and Director of Military Intelligence in June 1962, in which capacity he dealt with the defection of the intercept operator Brian Patchett, before retiring in 1965.

He was appointed a Commander of the Order of the British Empire in the 1961 Birthday Honours. and a Companion of the Order of the Bath in the 1965 New Year Honours.

References

British Army generals
Companions of the Order of the Bath
Companions of the Distinguished Service Order
Commanders of the Order of the British Empire
Recipients of the Military Cross
Royal Artillery officers
British Army personnel of World War II